Amashiyeh-ye Yek (also Romanized as ‘Amāshīyeh-ye Yek) is a village in Anaqcheh Rural District, in the Central District of Ahvaz County, Khuzestan Province, Iran. At the 2006 census, its population was 328, in 67 families.

References 

Populated places in Ahvaz County